The history of Saint Anthony's caves in Chernihiv, Ukraine started in the second half of the nineteenth century when Anthony of Kyiv came to Boldina Gora. The place had unique power, so he dug out a cave for solitude and prayers. Chernihiv and Kyiv were the largest centers of the Kievan Rus, and they faced constant confrontation. To keep up with Kyiv's pace, the first church of the contemporary Trinity Monastery complex appeared a century later. The total length of the Chernihiv underground premises is about 350 meters (1148 feet).

See also
 Near Caves of the Kyiv Pechersk Lavra system

References

Tourist attractions in Chernihiv
Buildings and structures in Chernihiv
Caves of Ukraine
Tourist attractions in Chernihiv Oblast
Tourism in Chernihiv